Reunion is an upcoming American comedy film directed by Chris Nelson and starring Lil Rel Howery.

Cast
Lil Rel Howery as Ray
Billy Magnussen
Jillian Bell as Vivian
Cassandra Blair as Meagan
Nina Dobrev
Chace Crawford as Mathew
Jamie Chung
Michael Hitchcock as Mr. Buckley
Dianne Doan as Lisa

Production
In August 2021, it was announced that Howery, Magnussen and Bell were cast in the film with filming set to occur in Los Angeles in the autumn.  Later that same month, it was announced that Dobrev, Chung, Hitchcock and Crawford joined the cast with production set to begin in Los Angeles the week the announcement was made.  On September 16, 2021, it was announced that Doan joined the cast and that filming took place in Los Angeles.  On September 23, 2021, it was announced that Blair joined the cast.

In November 2021, it was announced that filming wrapped.

References

External links
 

Upcoming films
American comedy films
Films shot in Los Angeles